The 2015–16 CWHL season is the ninth season of the Canadian Women's Hockey League (CWHL).

Offseason

CWHL Draft

For the second consecutive year, the Brampton Thunder held the first pick overall and selected Harvard defender Sarah Edney. Two members of Canada's gold medal winning roster at the 2014 Winter Olympics were selected during the first round: Marie-Philip Poulin by Les Canadiennes and Brianne Jenner by the Calgary Inferno. Calgary also selected Hayley Wickenheiser ninth overall. In total, the five teams selected 55 players over 13 rounds.

Regular season
Les Canadiennes won the Commissioner's Trophy for the best regular season records for the fifth time in seven years, eight points ahead of second-place Calgary Inferno. Montreal also lead the league with a +78 goal differential and an average of 4.75 goals per game. With a 5–4 win against the Brampton Thunder in the final game of the season, Calgary was the second team to secure home-ice advantage for the play-offs. Defending Clarkson Cup champions Boston Blades, however, would only record one shootout victory in their second game of the season, finishing last in the league with two points.

Regular season scoring was led by four Canadiennes players, with Marie-Philip Poulin claiming the Angela James Bowl as the CWHL's top scorer. Along with Natalie Spooner of the Toronto Furies and Laura Fortino of the Brampton Thunder, she was also nominated for the MVP title.

Milestones
In a game against the Brampton Thunder on  December 13, 2015, Noemie Marin registered the 200th point of her CWHL career
. She would record two assists in the game, including one on the game-winning tally, to reach the milestone.

Standings
 indicates team has clinched regular season title
 indicates team has clinched a playoff spot

All-Star Game

The CWHL All-Star Game was held at Toronto's Air Canada Centre for the second time. In an online poll, Natalie Spooner and Julie Chu voted as team captains by the fans. Chu's Team Black won the game 5–1, with Marie-Philip Poulin scoring two goals and being named the All-Star Game MVP.

Statistical leaders

Leading skaters 
The following players are sorted by points, then goals.

GP = Games played; G = Goals; A = Assists; Pts = Points; +/– = Plus-minus; PIM = Penalty minutes

Leading goaltenders 
The following goaltenders with a minimum 500 minutes played lead the league in goals against average.

GP = Games played; TOI = Time on ice (in minutes); SA = Shots against; GA = Goals against; SO = Shutouts; GAA = Goals against average; SV% = Save percentage; W = Wins; L = Losses; OT = Overtime/shootout loss

Clarkson Cup playoffs

Awards and honors
 CWHL Most Valuable Player: Marie-Philip Poulin, Montreal
 CWHL Top Forward: Marie-Philip Poulin, Montreal
 CWHL Defender of the Year: Laura Fortino, Brampton
 CWHL Goaltender of the Year: Charline Labonte, Montreal
 Angela James Bowl winner: Marie-Philip Poulin, Montreal
 CWHL Outstanding Rookie: Elana Lovell, Calgary
 CWHL Coach of the Year: Tyler Fines, Brampton
 CWHL Humanitarian of the Year: Lisa-Marie Breton, Montreal

CWHL All-Rookie Team
 Goaltender: Sydney Aveson
 Defender: Brigitte Lacquette
 Defender: Sarah Edney
 Forward: Elana Lovell
 Forward: Jillian Saulnier
 Forward: Rebecca Vint

References

 
Canadian Women's Hockey League seasons
1